Galaxy effective radius or half-light radius is the radius at which half of the total light of a galaxy is emitted. This assumes the galaxy has either intrinsic spherical symmetry or is at least circularly symmetric as viewed in the plane of the sky. Alternatively, a half-light contour, or isophote, may be used for spherically and circularly asymmetric objects.

 is an important length scale in  term in de Vaucouleurs law, which characterizes a specific rate at which surface brightness decreases as a function of radius:

At ,

See also

References

Physical quantities